Mirbat is a coastal town in the Dhofar governorate, in southwestern Oman. It was the site of the 1972 Battle of Mirbat between Communist guerrillas on one side and the armed forces of the Sultan of Oman and their Special Air Service advisers.

Mirbat (Moscha) was involved in the export of frankincense in ancient times, to places as far as China.

Mirbat also houses the mausoleum of Bin Ali.

See also 

 Battle of Mirbat

References

 
Populated places in the Dhofar Governorate
Populated coastal places in Oman